Sir Thomas Willes Chitty, 3rd Baronet (2 March 1926 – 7 March 2014), better known by his pen name Thomas Hinde, was a British novelist.

Life
Thomas Chitty was born in Felixstowe, Suffolk, England, the son of Sir Thomas Henry Willes Chitty, 2nd Baronet, a barrister, and his wife Ethel Constance Gladstone, daughter of Samuel Henry Gladstone. He was educated at Winchester College and University College, Oxford. After service in the Royal Navy, he worked briefly for the Inland Revenue and then for the Shell Petroleum Company, before becoming a full-time writer. He became a baronet on the death of his father in 1955.

Chitty married Susan Hopkinson (1929-2021), daughter of the novelist Antonia White, in 1951; the couple remained wed until his death in 2014; they had four children. Hinde and his wife, also an author writing under the name Susan Chitty, lived at Bow Cottage, West Hoathly, West Sussex, a village on the edge of Ashdown Forest in the High Weald.

Pseudonym
The surname Hinde belonged to Chitty's family history on his mother's side. Samuel Henry Gladstone (1853–1932) was son of Robert Gladstone, the younger (1811–1872), of Highfield, Cheetham Hill, Manchester, a member of the Liverpool Gladstone family. Robert Gladstone married in 1852 Anne Mary Hinde, daughter of Samuel Hinde of Lancaster; and after her death another Miss Hinde, a cousin of his first wife.

Works
His first novel, Mr Nicholas, was published in 1953. His second, Happy As Larry, the story of a disaffected, unemployable, aspiring writer with a failed marriage, led critics to associate him with the Angry Young Men movement. An excerpt from Happy As Larry appeared in the popular paperback anthology, Protest: The Beat Generation and the Angry Young Men.

Hinde published thirteen further novels before turning to non-fiction. After 1980, he also published books on English stately homes and gardens, English court life, and the forests of Britain, as well as histories of English schools.

Bibliography

Novels
Mr. Nicholas (1953)
Happy as Larry (1958)
For the Good of the Company (1961)
A Place Like Home (1962)
The Cage (1962)
Ninety Double Martinis (1963)
The Day the Call Came (1964) 
Games of Chance: The Interviewer, The Investigator (1965)
The Village (1966) 
High (1968)
Bird (1970)
Generally a Virgin (1972)
Agent (1974) 
Our Father (1975) 
Daymare (1980)

Nonfiction
Spain A Personal Anthology 1963 (Newnes)
On Next to Nothing: A Guide to Survival Today (1976, with Susan Chitty)
The Great Donkey Walk (1977, with Susan Chitty)
The Cottage Book: A Manual of Maintenance, Repair, and Construction (1979)
Sir Henry and Sons: A Memoir (1980)
A Field Guide to the English Country Parson (1983)
Stately Gardens of Britain (1983)
Forests of Britain (1985)
Just Chicken (1986, with Cordelia Chitty)
Capability Brown: The Story of a Master Gardener (1987)
Courtiers: 900 Years of English Court Life (1986)
Tales from the Pump Room: Nine Hundred Years of Bath: The Place, Its People, and Its Gossip (1988)
Imps of Promise: A History of the King's School, Canterbury (1990)
Paths of Progress: A History of Marlborough College (1992)
Highgate School: A History (1993)
The Martlet and the Griffen: An Illustrated History of Abingdon School(1997, With Michael St John Parker)

References

1926 births
2014 deaths
People from Felixstowe
People educated at Winchester College
Alumni of University College, Oxford
Baronets in the Baronetage of the United Kingdom
English male novelists
20th-century English novelists
20th-century English male writers
Chitty family